The 1991 Tippeligaen was the 47th completed season of top division football in Norway. 22 game-weeks were played with 3 points given for wins and 1 for draws. Number eleven and twelve are relegated. The winners of the two groups of the 1. divisjon are promoted, as well as the winner of a series of play-off matches between the two second placed teams in the two groups of the 1. divisjon and number ten in the Tippeligaen.

The season began on April 27, 1991. The season ended on October 13, 1991, with Viking claiming their eighth league title. Viking were thus the last club to win the league before Rosenborg's 13-year domination started.

Teams and locations
''Note: Table lists in alphabetical order.

League table

Results

Relegation play-offs
Brann, Bryne, and Strindheim played play-offs, Brann won and remained in Tippeligaen.

Results
Match 1: Bryne 0–1 Brann
Match 2: Brann 1–0 Strindheim
Match 3: Strindheim 0–2 Bryne

Table

Season statistics

Top scorers

Attendances

References

Eliteserien seasons
Norway
Norway
1